This is a list of World War II weapons of Ireland. Throughout World War II, Ireland held a policy of neutrality. Ireland prepared for invasions from both Britain and Nazi Germany. Some cooperation with the Allies did occur such as Plan W as well as allowing allied aircraft over Irish airspace through the Donegal Corridor and providing access to weather reports from the Atlantic Ocean which were used to help decide when D-day would occur. The IRA allied itself with Nazi Germany in pursuit of Irish republicanism as seen from Operation Dove. However they were not part of the Irish army  and were not supported by the Irish government and so will be left out of this list. Of note is that Ireland got a lot of British WWI weapons due to conflicts with the United Kingdom just after WWI such as the Irish War of Independence and Irish Civil War when a lot of these weapons would have been captured by Irish forces in the fighting.

Small arms

Rifles 
 Short Magazine Lee–Enfield No. 1 MKIII - Standard issue 

Springfield M1903 - Local Defence Force and Local Security Force
M1917 Enfield - Local Defence Force

Sidearms 
 Enfield No. 2 

Webley MK IV Revolver - Standard issue 
Mauser C96 - 295 in Army stockpiles

Machine guns 
 Vickers machine gun
 Lewis gun
Bren gun

Madsen Machine Gun - vehicle use 
Hotchkiss M1909 - vehicle use 
Vickers.50 Machine Gun  - vehicle use

Grenade 

 Mills bomb
 MK3 Rifle Grenade 
 Molotov Cocktail/Petrol Bomb (made and used during exercises)

Submachine Guns 

 M1921 Thompson -Army stockpiles left over from the Revolutionary period 
 Bergmann MP-18 - Army stockpiles put into commission

Sniper Rifles 

 Pattern 1914 (Scoped variant)

Shotguns 

 Winchester 1897
 Unidentified 12 Bore Shotgun

Melee Weapons 

 Pattern 1907 Bayonet
 Irish Army officers sabre

Anti-Tank Weapons 

 Boys Anti-Tank Rifle 
 Vickers QF 2-Pounder Anti-Tank Gun 
 25 lb Anti-Tank mine (Irish made) 
 The 'De Valera' mine (Irish made)

Artillery

Mortars 

 Brandt Mle 27/31
 ML-3 Inch 
 Brandt Mle 1935

Field artillery 

 QF 18-pounder gun
 BL 60-pounder gun
 QF 4.5-inch howitzer

Anti-Aircraft Guns 

 Bofors 40mm
 QF 3-Inch 20-cwt
 QF 3.7-Inch 
 QF 12-Pounder 12-cwt (modified for anti-aircraft purposes)

Coastal Defence Guns 

 BL 9.2 Inch
 BL 6-Inch
 QF 12-Pounder 12-cwt 
 QF 4.7 inch

Armoured fighting vehicles (AFVs)

Armoured cars 

 Rolls-Royce Armoured Car
 Landsverk L180
 Leyland Armoured Car
Beaverette
Universal 'Bren' Carrier
Ford MK V
Ford MK VI
Ford MK IV
Dodge MK VII
Dodge MK VIII
GSR Morris MK IV

Tanks 

 Landsverk L-60
 Vickers MK. D

AFV Armaments (not including small arms used as armaments) 

 Madsen 20mm 
QF 6-Pounder

Marine Service vessels 

 Muirchú

 PAS Fort Rannoch

 MTB-1

 MTB-2

 MTB-3

 MTB-4

 MTB-5

 MTB-6
 Various port control pilot boats

Other vehicles 

 Morris Commercial C8 FAT
 BSA M20 500cc Motorbike 
 Morris Commercial CDSW 
 Leyland Retriever Machinery Lorry

See also 
 List of aircraft of Ireland in World War II

References

World War II Weapons
Ireland
Ireland in World War II